Frenesia is a genus of northern caddisflies in the family Limnephilidae. There are at least two described species in Frenesia.

Species
These two species belong to the genus Frenesia:
 Frenesia difficilis (Walker, 1852)
 Frenesia missa (Milne, 1935)

References

Further reading

 
 
 

Trichoptera genera
Articles created by Qbugbot
Integripalpia